"Not What He Seems" is the eleventh episode of the second season of the American animated television series Gravity Falls, created by Alex Hirsch. The episode was written by Shion Takeuchi, Josh Weinstein, Jeff Rowe, Matt Chapman, and Hirsch, and directed by Stephen Sandoval. In this episode, Dipper and Mabel begin to question who Stan really is after officers arrest him for stealing chemical waste. The episode, which breaks the show's status quo by introducing Stan's long-lost twin brother, ends with a cliffhanger to the second half of the season.

"Not What He Seems" was first broadcast on March 9, 2015 on Disney XD, and was watched by 1.58 million households in the United States. It was the biggest broadcast ever for Gravity Falls during its run on Disney XD until the following episode, "A Tale of Two Stans", beat that record four months later.

Plot

Background
While Dipper and Mabel Pines are spending their summer in the town of Gravity Falls, their great uncle Stan has been working on an unknown machine in his basement underneath the Mystery Shack, trying to make it work without them knowing about his doings.

Events
In his laboratory under the Mystery Shack, Stan rigs drums of chemical waste to power the machine. He sets a timer for eighteen hours, when the machine will activate. Gravity anomalies occur in the meantime as a result of it. The next day, as Stan plays with Dipper and Mabel outside the shack, law enforcement officers arrest Stan for stealing chemical waste the night before. When child services take hold of Dipper and Mabel, the twins decide to clear Stan's name using footage from the shack's security camera of the night before. They break out of the car and head back to the shack. The tapes, however, prove his crime, and Dipper finds a box of fake identity documents and clippings from newspapers reporting Stan's death. In the box, Dipper finds a password on a slip of paper; Mabel identifies this as a button combination for the shack's vending machine.

In an interrogation room with Agent Powers, Stan asks for a phone call. He uses this to call Soos, the handyman of the Mystery Shack, instructing him to guard the vending machine. Stan escapes from the room after another anomaly and misdirects the agents to chase after a taxi, running the other direction to the shack. Meanwhile, Dipper and Mabel go to the vending machine, which Soos guards. They fight, but Dipper inputs the password, revealing the entrance to Stan's lab. Inside, Dipper is in disbelief that Stan had been hiding the first two journals from him. He puts the three journals together, forming the blueprints to Stan's machine. Under a black light, a secret message reads that, once the machine activates, the entire universe could be torn apart.

Dipper decides to override the machine, but not before Stan comes in to stop him. Another anomaly occurs, causing everyone to levitate. Mabel makes it to the abort lever as yet another anomaly occurs. Forced to decide between trusting Stan and stopping the machine, Mabel tearfully sides with Stan, enabling the activation of the machine and engulfing everything in a flash of light. When the anomaly ends, Dipper, Mabel, Stan, and Soos are unharmed. A man comes through the machine's portal, putting a six-fingered hand on the first journal and revealing himself to be the author. Stan introduces the man as his brother. Dipper and Mabel are petrified by shock, and Mabel asks if someone should faint, which Soos dutifully does.

During the closing credits, a flashback shows Stan and his brother as children from the back, swinging silently on a swing set as they look out to the ocean.

Production and themes

"Not What He Seems" is the eleventh episode of the second season of Gravity Falls, created by Alex Hirsch. He wrote it with Matthew Chapman, Jeff Rowe, Shion Takeuchi, and Josh Weinstein. It is the second episode to be directed by Stephen Sandoval. The final sequence revealing Ford was animated in-house by storyboard artist Dana Terrace, with Matt Braly providing key animation.

The episode, which halves the second season, ends with a cliffhanger to the second half of the season. The writers did this so a hiatus would fit and they could write the episode sooner. According to Hirsch, half the fandom of Gravity Falls had guessed Stan had a brother—revealed in the episode as the author of the three journals Dipper, Stan, and Gideon own—before the episode aired. In particular, fans wrote "Zapruder film"-level exposés in the form of "PowerPoint presentations, flow charts, timelines", rare for a Disney Channel show. Hirsch had the character in his pitch of the show to the network, with the writers placing clues of his existence from the first episode. Still, he and the writers took this element as a risk, and Hirsch said that the ending would be shocking to some. They found it necessary in the end to keep the characters interesting and break the status quo. Calling Gravity Falls about characters "first and foremost", Hirsch said that would be Mabel forgiving of Stan, while Dipper would be unforgiving of both Stan and himself, for the rest of the season. With Dipper, Hirsch described Stan being a con as "a huge blow to his ego, a huge betrayal, and I think it will leave him feeling isolated from his family in a way he hasn't been before".

The episode guest stars Nick Offerman as Agent Powers; he had previously appeared in the season opener "Scary-oke" and the episode "Northwest Mansion Mystery". Hirsch described this character, in addition to Agent Trigger, as plot devices to divide the protagonists and have them face their allegiances to one another.

Broadcast and reception
On its original airdate, 2.06 million people (and 1.02 million on the Internet) viewed "Not What He Seems", the most received by any series broadcast on Disney XD.

Alasdair Wilkins of The A.V. Club awarded the episode an "A" for expertly dealing with the relationships among Stan, Dipper, and Mabel. He applauded the way the show was able to combine the more "cerebral" elements of the plot into "the more general hurt that Dipper feels when he realizes just how much Stan has been lying to him and his sister." Alasdair also felt that the warm color scheme of the animation was complementary to the melancholy of the episode, and that the gravity anomaly scenes "represent the show at its most technically ambitious". Finally, he wrote that the blend of comedy and drama made it an "instant classic".

International airdates
 May 17, 2015: Switzerland
 October 4, 2015: Germany & Austria

References

2015 American television episodes
Gravity Falls episodes